KTDC may refer to:

 Kerala Tourism Development Corporation
 Kwun Tong District Council, the district council for the Kwun Tong District in Hong Kong
 KTDC-LP, a low-power radio station (105.3 FM) licensed to Muscatine, Iowa, United States